Cisticolas and allies form the bird family Cisticolidae. The International Ornithological Congress (IOC) recognizes these 168 species in the family; 53 are in genus Cisticola and the rest are distributed among 25 other genera. 

This list is presented according to the IOC taxonomic sequence and can also be sorted alphabetically by common name and binomial.

References

C
Cisticolidae